The 2009 UC Irvine Anteaters baseball team represented the University of California, Irvine in the NCAA Division I baseball season of 2009. The team played their home games at Anteater Ballpark in Irvine, California. The team was coached by Mike Gillespie in his second season at Irvine.

Pre-season
The Anteaters concluded the 2008 season with a 42-18 mark and made their second consecutive trip to the Super Regionals. They are a veteran-filled team, with 17 upperclassmen returning for the 2009 season. On January 20, 2009, the coaches in the Big West picked UC Irvine to finish second in the Big West behind Cal State Fullerton.

Roster

Coaches

Players

Schedule and results

|- align="center" bgcolor="#bbffbb"
|  || 2/20/09 ||  || Les Murakami Stadium || 5-1 || Bibona (1-0) || Kramer (0-1) || - ||  3844 || 1-0 || 
|- align="center" bgcolor="#bbffbb"
|  || 2/21/09 || Hawai'i || Les Murakami Stadium || 5-4 || Bergman (1-0) || Klein (0-1) || Pettis (1) || 2643 || 2-0 || 
|- align="center" bgcolor="#bbffbb"
|  || 2/21/09 || Hawai'i || Les Murakami Stadium || 5-4 || Bardeen (1-0) || Capaul (0-1) || Pettis (2) || 2643
|| 3-0 || 
|- align="center" bgcolor="FFBBBB"
|  || 2/22/09 || Hawai'i || Les Murakami Stadium || 4-7 || Sisto (1-0) || Hoover (0-1) || - || 2347
|| 3-1 || 
|- align="center" bgcolor="FFBBBB"
|  || 2/27/09 ||  || Minute Maid Park || 2-9 || Raley (2-0) || Bibona (1-1) || Thebeau (1) || 6979 || 3-2 || 
|- align="center" bgcolor="#bbffbb"
|  || 2/28/09 ||  || Minute Maid Park || 13-7 || Bergman (2-0) || Stuckey (0-1) || - || - || 4-2 || 
|- align="center" bgcolor="#bbffbb"
|  || 3/1/09 || UCLA || Minute Maid Park || 7-4 || Slaught (1-0) || Brewer (0-1) || Pettis (3) || 5356 || 5-2 || 
|- align="center" bgcolor="FFBBBB"
|  || 3/3/09 ||  || Anteater Ballpark || 3-11 || Carreon (1-0) || Hoover (0-2) || - || 846 || 5-3 || 
|- align="center" bgcolor="#bbffbb"
|  || 3/6/09 ||  || Baylor Ballpark || 13-5 || Bibona (2-1) || Roberson (0-2) || - || - || 6-3 || 
|- align="center" bgcolor="FFBBBB"
|  || 3/7/09 ||  || Baylor Ballpark || 3-4 || Verrett (4-0) || Hamilton (0-1) || - || 3077 || 6-4 || 
|- align="center" bgcolor="#bbffbb"
|  || 3/8/09 ||  || Baylor Ballpark || 6-5 || Pettis (1-0) || Johnson (1-2) || - || - || 7-4 || 
|- align="center" bgcolor="#bbffbb"
|  || 3/10/09 ||  || Dedeaux Field || 6-5 (12) || Bardeen (2-0) || Vasquez (0-2) || - || 395 || 8-4 || 
|- align="center" bgcolor="#bbffbb"
|  || 3/13/09 ||  || Anteater Ballpark || 7-5 || Bardeen (3-0) || Claiborne (1-1) || Pettis (4) || 653 || 9-4 || 
|- align="center" bgcolor="FFBBBB"
|  || 3/14/09 || Tulane || Anteater Ballpark || 3-6 || Petiton (3-0) || Bergman (2-1) || Pepitone (3) || 563 || 9-5 || 
|- align="center" bgcolor="#bbffbb"
|  || 3/15/09 || Tulane || Anteater Ballpark || 5-4 || Pettis (2-0) || Pepitone (0-3) || - || 948 || 10-5 || 
|- align="center" bgcolor="#bbffbb"
|  || 3/20/09 ||  || Anteater Ballpark || 1-0 || Bibona (3-1) || Stassi (2-3) || Pettis (5) || 363 || 11-5 || 
|- align="center" bgcolor="FFBBBB"
|  || 3/21/09 || Nevada || Anteater Ballpark || 4-5 || Miller (3-0) || Necke (0-1) || - || 483 || 11-6 || 
|- align="center" bgcolor="#bbffbb"
|  || 3/22/09 || Nevada || Anteater Ballpark || 10-2 || Slaught (2-0) || Achelpohl (1-2) || - || 356 || 12-6 || 
|- align="center" bgcolor="#bbffbb"
|  || 3/24/09 ||  || Anteater Ballpark || 17-13 || Avison (1-0) || Kittredge (1-2) || - || 248 || 13-6 || 
|- align="center" bgcolor="FFBBBB"
|  || 3/25/09 || Washington || Anteater Ballpark || 12-13 || Haehl (1-0) || Necke (0-2) || Kittredge (1) || 178 || 13-7 || 
|- align="center" bgcolor="#bbffbb"
|  || 3/27/09 ||  || Anteater Ballpark || 5-2 || Bibona (4-1) || Mauldin (3-2) || Pettis (6) || 563 || 14-7 || 1-0
|- align="center" bgcolor="#bbffbb"
|  || 3/28/09 || Cal Poly || Anteater Ballpark || 11-3 || Bergman (3-1) || Leonard (3-1) || - || 615 || 15-7 || 2-0
|- align="center" bgcolor="#bbffbb"
|  || 3/29/09 || Cal Poly || Anteater Ballpark || 7-6 || Bardeen (4-0) || Radeke (1-1) || Pettis (7) || 668 || 16-7 || 3-0
|- align="center" bgcolor="#bbffbb"
|  || 3/31/09 || Loyola Marymount || George C. Page Stadium || 19-8 || Avison (2-0) || Lally (0-2) || - || 213 || 17-7 || 3-0
|- align="center" bgcolor="#bbffbb"
|  || 4/3/09 ||  || Goodwin Field || 2-1 || Bibona (5-1) || Renken (4-2) || Pettis (8) || 2711 || 18-7 || 4-0
|- align="center" bgcolor="#bbffbb"
|  || 4/4/09 || Cal State Fullerton || Goodwin Field || 6-1 || Bergman (4-1) || Ramirez (3-1) || Bardeen (1) || 3056 || 19-7 || 5-0
|- align="center" bgcolor="FFBBBB"
|  || 4/5/09 || Cal State Fullerton || Goodwin Field || 4-5 || Ackland (2-0) || Pettis (2-1) || - || 3216 || 19-8 || 5-1
|- align="center" bgcolor="FFBBBB"
|  || 4/7/09 || UCLA || Jackie Robinson Stadium || 3-8 || Rasmussen (2-2) || Hamilton (0-2) || - || 535 || 19-9 || 5-1
|- align="center" bgcolor="#bbffbb"
|  || 4/9/09 ||  || Anteater Ballpark || 3-2 (12) || Pettis (3-1) || Corrales (0-1) || - || 745 || 20-9 || 6-1
|- align="center" bgcolor="#bbffbb"
|  || 4/10/09 || Long Beach State || Anteater Ballpark || 6-3 || Bergman (5-1) || Thompson (2-5) || Pettis (9) || 764 || 21-9 || 7-1
|- align="center" bgcolor="#bbffbb"
|  || 4/11/09 || Long Beach State || Anteater Ballpark || 9-5 || Slaught (3-0) || Gagnon (2-4) || Necke (1) || 923 || 22-9 || 8-1
|- align="center" bgcolor="#bbffbb"
|  || 4/13/09 || Loyola Marymount || Anteater Ballpark || 6-4 || Necke (1-2) || Eusebio (3-3) || Pettis (10) || 523 || 23-9 || 8-1
|- align="center" bgcolor="FFBBBB"
|  || 4/14/09 ||  || John Cunningham Stadium || 4-7 || Hauser (2-1) || Avison (2-1) || Campbell (2) || 187 || 23-10 || 8-1
|- align="center" bgcolor="#bbffbb"
|  || 4/17/09 ||  || Riverside Sports Complex || 16-1 || Bilbona (6-1) || Bargas (4-3) || - || 431 || 24-10 || 9-1
|- align="center" bgcolor="#bbffbb"
|  || 4/18/09 || UC Riverside || Riverside Sports Complex || 9-6 || Bergman (6-1) || Andriese (3-2) || Pettis (11) || 538 || 25-10 || 10-1
|- align="center" bgcolor="#bbffbb"
|  || 4/19/09 || UC Riverside || Riverside Sports Complex || 12-9 || Dufour (1-0) || Larkins (1-1) || Pettis (12) || 257 || 26-10 || 11-1
|- align="center" bgcolor="#bbffbb"
|  || 4/20/09 ||  || Anteater Ballpark || 9-6 || Dufour (2-0) ||  Thornton (0-1) || - || 818 || 27-10 || 11-1
|- align="center" bgcolor="#bbffbb"
|  || 4/21/09 || Oregon || Anteater Ballpark || 7-4 || Avison (3-1) || Whitmore (0-6) || Pettis (13) || 467 || 28-10 || 11-1
|- align="center" bgcolor="#bbffbb"
|  || 4/23/09 ||  || Spring Mobile Ballpark || 8-3 || Bibona (7-1) || Budrow (4-3) || - || 190 || 29-10 || 11-1
|- align="center" bgcolor="#bbffbb"
|  || 4/24/09 || Utah || Spring Mobile Ballpark || 10-1 || Bergman (7-1) || Wilding (1-5) || - || 330 || 30-10 || 11-1
|- align="center" bgcolor="FFBBBB"
|  || 4/25/09 || Utah || Spring Mobile Ballpark || 3-7 || Whatcott (3-1) || Necke (1-3) || - || 186 || 30-11 || 11-1
|- align="center" bgcolor="#bbffbb"
| || 4/28/09 || Southern California || Anteater Ballpark || 6-5 || Pettis (4-1) || Vasquez (2-4) || - || 1152 || 31-11 || 11-1
|- align="center" bgcolor="#bbffbb"
|  || 5/1/09 ||  || Anteater Ballpark || 7-1 || Bibona (8-1) || Juarez (4-5) || - || 793 || 32-11 || 12-1
|- align="center" bgcolor="#bbffbb"
|  || 5/2/09 || Cal State Northridge || Anteater Ballpark || 12-7 || Bergman (8-1) || Gorski (1-3) || - || 657 || 33-11 || 13-1
|- align="center" bgcolor="#bbffbb"
|  || 5/3/09 || Cal State Northridge || Anteater Ballpark || 5-2 || Slaught (4-0) || Ott (1-4) || Pettis (14) || 1215 || 34-11 || 14-1
|- align="center" bgcolor="#bbffbb"
|  || 5/8/09 ||  || Klein Family Field || 11-6 || Bilbona (9-1) || Centanni (4-5) || - || 882 || 35-11 || 15-1
|- align="center" bgcolor="#bbffbb"
|  || 5/9/09 || Pacific || Klein Family Field || 5-4 || Bardeen (5-0) || McCain (2-2) || Pettis (15) || 789 || 36-11 || 16-1
|- align="center" bgcolor="#bbffbb"
|  || 5/10/09 || Pacific || Klein Family Field || 6-4 || Slaught (5-0) || Niley (1-4) || Pettis (16) || 600 || 37-11 || 17-1
|- align="center" bgcolor="FFBBBB"
|  || 5/12/09 || San Diego || Anteater Ballpark || 2-9 || Hauser (5-2) || Pettis (4-2) || - || 587 || 37-12 || 14-1
|- align="center" bgcolor="#bbffbb"
|  || 5/15/09 ||  || Anteater Ballpark || 9-3 || Bilbona (10-1) || Chew (1-7) || - || 1597 || 38-12 || 18-1
|- align="center" bgcolor="#bbffbb"
|  || 5/16/09 || UC Davis || Anteater Ballpark || 19-6 || Bergman (9-1) || Lyman (0-4) || - || 608 || 39-12 || 19-1
|- align="center" bgcolor="#bbffbb"
|  || 5/17/09 || UC Davis || Anteater Ballpark || 8-1 || Slaught (6-0) || Quist (2-6) || - || 1102 || 40-12 || 20-1
|- align="center" bgcolor="#bbffbb"
|  || 5/19/09 || UCLA || Anteater Ballpark || 5-4 (10) || Pettis (5-2) || Cole (4-7) || - || 2762 || 41-12 || 20-1
|- align="center" bgcolor="#bbffbb"
|  || 5/22/09 ||  || Caesar Uyesaka Stadium || 11-7 || Bibona (11-1) || Ford (4-5) || Dufour (1) || 598 || 42-12 || 21-1
|- align="center" bgcolor="FFBBBB"
|  || 5/23/09 || UC Santa Barbara || Caesar Uyesaka Stadium || 2-8 || Hollands (6-6) || Bergman (9-2) || - || 590 || 42-13 || 21-2
|- align="center" bgcolor="#bbffbb"
|  || 5/24/09 || UC Santa Barbara || Caesar Uyesaka Stadium || 15-3 || Slaught (7-0) || Samuels (3-3) || - || 786 || 43-13 || 22-2
|-

|- align="center" bgcolor="#BBFFBB"
| || 5/29/09 ||  || Anteater Ballpark || 4-2 || Bibona (12-1) || Benny (4-4) || Pettis (17) || 3002 || 44-13 || 1-0
|- align="center" bgcolor="#FFBBBB"
|  || 5/30/09 || Virginia || Anteater Ballpark || 0-5 || Hultzen (10-2) || Bergman (8-2) || - || 2282 || 44-14 || 1-1
|- align="center" bgcolor="#BBFFBB"
|  || 5/31/09 ||  || Anteater Ballpark || 14-3 || Slaught (8-0) || Rasmussen (1-2) || - || 1856 || 45-14 || 2-1
|- align="center" bgcolor="#FFBBBB"
|  || 5/31/09 || Virginia || Anteater Ballpark || 1-4 || Carraway (7-1) || Necke (1-4) || Arico (11) || 1500 || 45-15 || 2-2
|-

Rankings

Several weeks of the Coaches' poll are unavailable.

Awards and honors

Major League Baseball Draft

References

External links
UC Irvine Anteaters baseball website
UC Irvine Anteaters Schedule

UC Irvine Anteaters baseball seasons
UC Irvine Anteaters
Big West Conference baseball champion seasons